Tsakani is the second album by Tsakani Mhinga. Like its predecessor it won the South African Music Awards R&B Best Album.

Track list
Eject Yo' Ass!	
Sweet Love	
The Feeling's Mutual (I'm In Love)	
Leaving My History	
Mind Yo' Buziness (Boxsta 2001 Mix)	
I Find It So Strange	
Drowning In Heaven	
Where Did I Go Wrong

References

2001 albums
Tsakani Mhinga albums